A hitch knot is a type of knot used to secure a rope to an object or another rope. It is used in a variety of situations, including climbing, sailing, and securing loads. Hitch knots are classified based on their ability to be tightened or released, their resistance to slipping, and their strength. Some common types of hitch knots include the fisherman's knot, the water knot, and the clove hitch. Hitch knots are important because they allow a rope to be securely fastened to an object, enabling the rope to support weight or transmit force.

Physical theory of hitches
A simple mathematical theory of hitches has been proposed by Bayman and extended by Maddocks and Keller. It makes predictions that are approximately correct when tested empirically.

Alphabetical list of hitch knots

See also
 List of knots
 Single hitch

References